This is a List of Portuguese football transfers summer 2012. The summer transfer window opened on 1 July and closed at midnight on 31 August. Only moves involving Primeira Liga clubs are listed. Players without a club may join a club at any time, either during or in between transfer windows.

Transfers

 A player who signed with a club before the 1st of July 2012 will officially join his new club on 1 July 2012. While a player who joined after the 1st of July will join his new club following his signature of the contract.

References

External links
 Primeira Liga Transfers

2012–13 in Portuguese football
Football transfers summer 2012
Lists of Portuguese football transfers